Superstar K5 is the fifth season of the South Korean television talent show series Superstar K, which premiered on 9 August 2013 on Mnet and aired Friday nights at 11PM KST. On July 11, 2013, it was confirmed that Lee Seung-chul and Yoon Jong-shin would be returning to join the judges member panel, the latter having been missing from the previous season. This season also saw the addition of Lee Ha-neul of DJ DOC as a judge following the departure of Yoon Mi-rae. This season saw over 1,982,661 applicants across the multiple avenues of entry for the show.

Regional auditions 
Audition hopefuls could audition in any of the several available audition venues. Additionally, new ways were devised for those unable to attend including as via UGC, KakaoTalk, Karaoke rooms or via secret nomination from family or friends.

Preliminary Auditions for the 1st, 2nd and 3rd Regionals were held in these cities:

The Daegu and Daejeon audition episodes were not aired due to production scheduling.

Preliminary auditions 
The preliminary auditions, whilst having traditionally featured either one of the three main judges, has also featured special judges for certain regional auditions. Confirmed special judges that will be featured in the preliminaries will include: Jung Jae-hyung, 2AM member Jo Kwon, Joo Hyun-mi, Brown Eyed Girls' Gain, solo singer Ivy, Clazziquai's Alex and Son Dam-bi.

SuperWeek 
With 100 contestants from the audition rounds; judges were given the task of reducing these numbers to 50 through an individual elimination round. The next round consisting of contestants splitting into groups where they were both judged and then advanced onto the next round.

The newest addition to the Superstar K5 format was the BlackWeek round, where contestants participated in a rival collaboration mission. For this round, contestants were given scores by a small focus audience which added weight to the scoring of the judges, who ultimately made the final decisions on the next fifteen contestants to advance to the next round. The fifteen contestants were flown to Jeju Island, where each contestant was given an envelope to be unopened. Inside this enveloped contained a pre-determined decision by the judges on whether the contestant had already made it to the final ten, however, contestants had to partake in a final elimination round which could either reconfirm the judges decision or force them to change the content of the envelope.

Finalists 
Plan B (플랜비) is a four-member vocalist group, made up of an assortment of other male contestants whom were either solo singers or duo groups who were forced to band together as part of the SuperWeek rounds. The group currently consists of: Lee Kyung-hyun, Lee Dong-hoon, Yoon Tae-kyung and Choi Jung-hoon.

Jung Eun-woo (정은우) (born February 4, 1997) is from Daejeon, South Korea. She previously auditioned for the first season of Superstar K and was also a former trainee at LOEN Entertainment. 

Song Hee Jin (born August 19, 1995) is from Seoul, South Korea. In 2017, she debuted with girl group Good Day under C9 Entertainment.

Parc Jae-jung (박재정) (born December 25, 1995) is from Orlando, Florida. In 2015, he was signed to Mystic Entertainment.

Weebly (위블리) is a three-member female vocalist group. The group consists of Nam Ju-mi, Lee Soo-min and Lee Gi-lim.

Im Sun-young (임순영) (born February 26, 1988), also known as Neo Yim, was born in Seoul, South Korea. He is from Boston, Massachusetts, where he previously attended Berklee College of Music. Neo is also a competitive player in the Super Street Fighter IV circuit, known by the pseudonym WeirdoNeo. He finished in 5th place for East Coast Throwdown 5 in Super Street Fighter 4 Arcade Edition v2012 in early 2013, using character Juri.

Kim Min-ji (김민지) (born July 13, 1993) is from Seoul, South Korea.

Jang Won-ki (장원기) (born February 5, 1981) is from Ganghwado, South Korea. A solo singer; he was also once part of a R&B group called EbonyHill (에보니힐) where he served as the main vocalist.

MashBro (마시브로) is a collaborative group between the male vocalist group, 'NeighBro' (네이브로) and the rock band, 'Maysta Band' (마시따 밴드). The members of 'NeighBro' consist of Kim Kyo-bum, Lee Seung-hyun, Jung Won-bo and Yoon Soo-yong; whereas 'Maysta Band' includes:  Shin Seok-chul, Lee Kyung-nam and Hong Jin-young.

Park Si-hwan(박시환) is a mechanic, aged 28. TOP 2 (born July 30, 1987)

Finals 
Unlike the previous season, there were 10 finalists for this season. The scoring of each contestants was a summation of the judges score, which consisted of 40%, and the general public votes which made up the remaining 60%. In each elimination episode, two contestants were eliminated from those of the bottom three contestants who had received the lowest overall score. However, while the lowest contestants was automatically eliminated, the remaining eliminated spot was decided by a general public vote on the other two remaining contestants, with the result revealed in the following episode.

Top 10 - Time Capsule

 Group performance: "처음 그 느낌처럼 (Like The First Feeling)"  (Shin Seung-hun)

Top 8 - Special Thanks To

Top 6 - Judge's Choice of Song

The contestants sang songs from any of the judges that they were assigned to for this episode.

In contrast to previous elimination stages, the contestant whom was eliminated was determined by a final performance from the two contestants who had received the lowest votes; with judges making the final decision on who would proceed to the Final 5.

Top 5 - Public Requests

For this round, the contestant chose a song from a number of requests made by the public on a message forum.

Top 4 - Music from Legends

Top 3 - Song Rendition / Rival Mission
As well as having to rendition several songs, each contestant also faced off against one another in a rival-style competition for this round.

Top 2 - Own Song Choices / New Song
Each contestant was free to choose which songs to sing for this round. Additionally, each singer was given a song that had been specifically produced for them.

Television Ratings 

 AGB Nielsen Media Research

References

External links
Superstar K5 Official web site
Superstar K5 Official video web site on Naver.

2013 South Korean television seasons